Pingshi Prison is a prison outside Pingshi Town, Lechang City, Guangdong Province, People's Republic of China connected to the Guangbei Tea Farm.

The prison was established in 1955 and has been associated with the Luojiadu Coal Mine for decades.

See also
 List of prisons in Guangdong

References

1955 establishments in China
Prisons in Guangdong
Buildings and structures in Shaoguan